M J Gleeson Group plc founded in 1903, is listed on the London Stock Exchange, and has two distinct businesses Gleeson Homes and Gleeson Strategic Land.

History
The business was founded by Michael Joseph Gleeson, the official date given by the company being 1903. Having travelled from Cloonmore, County Galway a small hamlet in the West of Ireland, to Sheffield to find work as a bricklayer. There he joined an Irish family business specialising in housing development and building contracting. A few years later he married his employer's eldest daughter.  In due course, he inherited his father-in-law's firm and changed its name to M J Gleeson in 1915.

Michael Gleeson operated as a contractor and a developer in the Sheffield area, and owned cinemas and a racetrack. The firm began taking contracts in southeast England in 1930 and in 1932 Michael sent his nephew John Patrick 'Jack' Gleeson to manage the embryonic housing developments.

Gleeson began with building an estate of some 750 houses in Cheam, followed by smaller estates in Ewell and Sutton, all at the time in Surrey.

During World War II, Gleeson concentrated on the construction of aerodromes for military use, giving it civil engineering capability that was to be its strength after the war. Although the company again undertook housing and property development in 1955, the flotation of 1960 stressed civil engineering contracts which included power stations, sewage works and sea defences.

Like his uncle before him, Jack had no sons and brought in his nephew to succeed him; Dermot Gleeson had been working in the political arena and first joined the Board as a non executive director in 1973; he joined the company full time in 1979, became deputy managing director in 1981 and chief executive in 1988.

The group had been extending its property holdings, and it used the housing recession of 1990, to increase its commitment to private housing. The small quoted company, Colroy, was bought in 1991, followed by the residential business of the Portman Building Society in October 1994.

In 2005, the group made a £18m loss, primarily due to losses in the building division, which was then sold to the management. A strategic review was announced in March 2006. The civil engineering business would be sold (it was bought by the Black & Veatch) as would peripheral businesses; the investment properties would be put up for sale, and traditional speculative housing replaced by urban regeneration.

By the end of the year, the group was concentrating on urban regeneration, residential property management and land trading. However, substantial losses were again incurred in 2008 and 2009; costs were cut and the geographical focus was narrowed to the north of England. Following the departure of CEO Jolyon Harrison, appointed in 2012, James Thomson, former CEO of Keepmoat Homes, was appointed chief executive officer on an interim basis in June 2019. In April 2022, Thomson announced his intention to stand down on 31 December 2022, with Vistry Group's chief operating officer Graham Prothero (formerly CEO at Galliford Try) nominated as his successor.

Gleeson forecast a 45% fall in revenue for the financial year to 30 June 2020, due to the impact of the Covid19 Pandemic in the United Kingdom.

Operations
The company has two divisions:
Gleeson Regeneration and Homes equally trading as Gleeson Homes (brownfield land in the Midlands and North of England). Gleeson Homes has three divisions, Yorkshire and Midlands, North Eastern and North West with eight area offices in the Midlands, South Yorkshire, East Yorkshire, Tees Valley, Tyne & Wear, Cumbria, Merseyside and Greater Manchester with a head office in Sheffield.
Gleeson Strategic Land (options over land in the South of England)

Controversy
In May 2018, Gleeson Homes was accused in the UK Parliament of applying "opaque charges that are not always apparent to the home owner at the time of purchase".

Major projects
The Crystal Palace National Sports Centre in London, completed in 1964.
The Crucible Theatre in Sheffield, completed in 1971.
Hounslow Civic Centre, completed in 1975.

References

External links 
Official site

Construction and civil engineering companies established in 1903
Construction and civil engineering companies of the United Kingdom
Companies listed on the London Stock Exchange
1903 establishments in England
British companies established in 1903